Jeremy James Smith (born 18 July 1981) is a New Zealand former professional rugby league footballer who previously played for the Parramatta Eels and the South Sydney Rabbitohs in the NRL, and the Salford City Reds and the Wakefield Trinity Wildcats in the Super League.

Playing career
A St. George Dragons junior, Smith made the Junior Kiwis in 1998. He played for the Aotearoa Māori side at the 2000 World Cup. In 2001 he played for the Hibiscus Coast Raiders in the Bartercard Cup.

Smith played for the Parramatta Eels between 2005 and 2006.  Smith was suspended for four matches in 2006 after pushing a referee in Parramatta's bizarre 8–1 loss to St. George.  The judiciary had found that Smith pushed referee Sean Hampstead in the back with both hands after a scrum was ruled against Parramatta. He has also represented the New Zealand Maori side.

Smith then signed with South Sydney for the 2007 NRL season. He penned his deal short after the announcement that his coach at the time, Jason Taylor would also join the South Sydney club in 2007.  Smith joined the Salford City Reds at the beginning of the 2009 season.  Smith again played for the New Zealand Māori in 2010 against England.

Smith has signed a one-year deal with Super League outfit, Wakefield Trinity ahead of the 2011 season. Smith was injured during the off season and could not play in any friendlies due to visa problems, which meant he had little match fitness when he made his début in Round 3 against Salford.  He returned to Australia in 2012, signing with the St. George Illawarra Dragons and playing NSW Cup for the Illawarra Cutters.

References

External links
Salford City Reds profile
Jeremy Smith NZLEAGUE.CO.NZ
South Sydney Rabbitohs profile

1981 births
Living people
Hibiscus Coast Raiders players
Illawarra Cutters players
Junior Kiwis players
New Zealand Māori rugby league players
New Zealand Māori rugby league team players
New Zealand national rugby league team players
New Zealand rugby league players
North Sydney Bears NSW Cup players
Parramatta Eels players
Rugby league five-eighths
Rugby league halfbacks
Rugby league players from Huntly, New Zealand
Salford Red Devils players
South Sydney Rabbitohs players
Wakefield Trinity players